Al Morris is an American former Negro league outfielder who played between 1928 and 1930.

Morris made his Negro leagues debut in 1928 with the Nashville Elite Giants. He played three seasons with Nashville through 1930, and also played for the Louisville Black Caps in 1930.

References

External links
 and Baseball-Reference Black Baseball stats and Seamheads

Year of birth missing
Place of birth missing
Louisville Black Caps players
Nashville Elite Giants players
Baseball outfielders